Megestrol is a progestin of the 17α-hydroxyprogesterone group which was never marketed and is not currently used clinically. Its acylated derivative megestrol acetate is also a progestogen, which, in contrast to megestrol itself, has been extensively used as a pharmaceutical drug.

Synthesis

See also 
 Megestrol acetate
 Medroxyprogesterone
 Medroxyprogesterone acetate

References 

Tertiary alcohols
Dienes
Diketones
Pregnanes
Progestogens